The Association of International Research and Development Centers for Agriculture (AIRCA) is an international, non-profit alliance focused on increasing food security by supporting smallholder agriculture and rural enterprise within healthy, sustainable and climate-smart landscapes.

Overview and focus 
AIRCA unites six international agricultural research and development centers which focus on a diverse mix of commodities, crops and issues including tropical agriculture, vegetable production, bamboo and rattan, insect pests, fertilizer use, underutilized crops, biosaline agriculture and sustainable development in mountains.

The members of AIRCA address sustainable agriculture and the environment at the landscape level. The centers create solutions that take into account the diversity of interactions among people and the environment, agricultural and non-agricultural systems, the crossing of national boundaries and other factors that represent the entire context of agriculture.

AIRCA members serve more than 60 countries comprising over 70% of the world’s population from across the Americas, Africa and the Asia-Pacific region. The broad alliance has collective access to a wide variety of crops and ecosystems.

The combined resources of AIRCA can be used to achieve 10 of the 17 Sustainable Development Goals (SDGs) established by the United Nations in 2015.

Relationship to CGIAR and FAO 
AIRCA member organizations work with crops of high economic, social, nutritional and ecological value. This complements and contrasts with the work of the Food and Agriculture Organization (FAO) and the CGIAR who work primarily in staple crops.

AIRCA does have some overlap with the CGIAR, however the CGIAR generally focuses more on agricultural research while AIRCA has more of a concentration on the implementation of agricultural research and development communication. AIRCA has a strong orientation toward problem solving at a system level, rather than a focus on a single commodity.

History 
AIRCA was launched on 2 March 2012 at the headquarters of the Food and Agriculture Organization (FAO) in Rome, Italy.

It was publicly presented in Punta del Este, Uruguay, on 30 October 2012 during the second Global Conference on Agricultural Research for Development.

Members

References

External links 

Agricultural research institutes
International scientific organizations
International development agencies
International research institutes